is a railway station in the city of Kosai, Shizuoka, Japan operated by both JR Central and by the third sector Tenryū Hamanako Railroad. The station serves both Kosai, and a portion of Toyohashi. The border between Shizuoka Prefecture and Aichi Prefecture bisects the platform of Shinjohara Station.

Lines
Shinjohara Station is served by the Tōkaidō Main Line and is located  282.4 kilometers from the starting point of the line at Tokyo Station. It is also a terminal station for the Tenryū Hamanako Line and is located 67.7 kilometers from the opposing terminus at Kakegawa Station.

Station layout
The JR Central portion of the station has a side platform serving track 1 and an island platform serving tracks 2 and 3, but track 3 is seldom used. The platforms are connected by a footbridge. The station building has automated ticket machines, TOICA automated ticket barriers, and a staffed ticket office. The Tenryū Hamanako Line Station a single dead-headed side platform serving one track. The station building is a two-story structure located to the east of the single-story JR building.

Platforms

Adjacent stations

History
The station opened on December 1, 1936. With the privatization of Japanese National Railways (JNR) on 1 April 1987, the station came under the control of JR Central.

Station numbering was introduced to the section of the Tōkaidō Line operated JR Central in March 2018; Shinjohara Station was assigned station number CA40.

Passenger statistics
In fiscal 2017, the JR portion of the station was used by an average of 3975 passengers daily and the Tenryū Hamanako Railroad portion was used by 762 passengers daily  (boarding passengers only).

Surrounding area
 former Shinjo village hall

See also
 List of Railway Stations in Japan

References

 Yoshikawa, Fumio. Tokaido-sen 130-nen no ayumi. Grand-Prix Publishing (2002) .

External links

 Tenryū Hamanako Railroad Station information 
		 

Railway stations in Japan opened in 1936
Railway stations in Shizuoka Prefecture
Stations of Central Japan Railway Company
Stations of Tenryū Hamanako Railroad
Tōkaidō Main Line